Perez. is a 2014 Italian neo-noir film written and directed by Edoardo De Angelis. It was screened in the Horizons section at the 71st Venice International Film Festival.

Plot 
Demetrio Perez is a famous criminal lawyer from Naples who years ago was considered one of the best in his field, but after having made too many enemies  is now reduced to working as a public defender. His life begins to fall apart when his daughter Tea falls madly in love with Francesco Corvino, the son of a boss of the Camorra.

Luca Buglione, the boss of a rival clan, decides to become a pentito. He makes a deal with Perez: if the lawyer manages to retrieve a batch of smuggled diamonds for him, he will then testify against Francesco.

Cast 
 Luca Zingaretti as Demetrio Perez
 Marco D'Amore as Francesco Corvino
 Simona Tabasco as Tea Perez
 Massimiliano Gallo as Luca Buglione
 Giampaolo Fabrizio as Ignazio Merolla
 Ivan Castiglione as Walter

See also    
 List of Italian films of 2014

References

External links 

2014 films
2014 crime films
Italian crime films
Films set in Naples
Italian neo-noir films
2010s Italian films